Gerald Nutz (born 25 January 1994) is an Austrian professional footballer who plays for SV Lafnitz.

Personal
He is the brother of Austrian footballer Stefan Nutz.

External links
 
 

1994 births
Living people
Austrian footballers
Association football midfielders
Kapfenberger SV players
Wolfsberger AC players